Kang Dong-Gu (Hangul: 강동구; born 4 August 1983) is a South Korean football player. His previous club is Jeju United, Suwon City FC and Yesan FC.

Club career
Kang started his professional football career in 2007 with K-League side Jeju United. During this period, he played 8 league games and 8 league cup games. In 2009, he moved to National League side Suwon City FC, where he stayed until the late 2010 switch to Yesan FC. On 21 August 2010, he made his Yesan debut against Incheon Korail in the 1–5 away defeat. In 2011, he was released.

See also
Football in South Korea
List of football clubs in South Korea

References

External links 

1983 births
Living people
South Korean footballers
K League 1 players
K League 2 players
Korea National League players
Jeju United FC players
Suwon FC players
Association football defenders